Pamela J. Althoff (born November 22, 1953) is a Republican politician from Illinois. She has held several elected positions, including serving in the Illinois Senate, representing the 32nd District from her appointment in March 2003 through September 2018.

Early life, education and career
Althoff was born in Chicago. She earned a bachelor's degree in Education at Illinois State University in 1975 and a master's degree in Education at Northeastern Illinois University in 1978. She was the city clerk of the City of McHenry, Illinois from 1994 to 2001 and was the mayor of McHenry from 2001 to 2003.

Illinois Senate
Richard O. Klemm resigned from the Illinois Senate effective February 9, 2003. The Republican Legislative Committee of the 32nd Legislative District appointed Althoff to fill the vacancy for the remainder of the 93rd General Assembly. She was sworn into office on March 7, 2003. Althoff was elected to the position in the 2004 general election.

Althoff served on the Committees on Appropriations II, (minority spokesperson); Local Government, Appropriations I; Transportation; Domestic Violence Task Force; Local Government Task Force; Violent Crime Advisory Commission as well as deficit reduction, Labor, and Higher Education committees.

In 2017, she announced she would not run again for re-election in 2018. She resigned early from the Illinois Senate on September 30, 2018, and was replaced by the Republican nominee for the seat, Craig Wilcox.

Later career
In 2017, Althoff announced she would run for the McHenry County Board. After her retirement from the Senate, she registered as a lobbyist. As of 2022, Althoff is the executive director of the Cannabis Business Association of Illinois, a trade association for the legal cannabis industry in Illinois.

References

External links
 Biography, bills and committees at the 98th Illinois General Assembly
 By session: 100th, 99th, 98th, 97th, 96th, 95th, 94th, 93rd
 State Senator Pamela Althoff constituency site
 
 Biography at Ballotpedia
 Financial information (state office) at the National Institute for Money in State Politics
 Appearances on C-SPAN programs
 Profile at Illinois State Senate Republicans

Living people
Republican Party Illinois state senators
Women state legislators in Illinois
1953 births
Politicians from Chicago
Illinois State University alumni
Northeastern Illinois University alumni
Mayors of places in Illinois
21st-century American politicians
21st-century American women politicians
People from McHenry, Illinois
Women mayors of places in Illinois